The 1900 United States presidential election in Kentucky took place on November 6, 1900. All contemporary 45 states were part of the 1900 United States presidential election. Kentucky voters chose 13 electors to the Electoral College, which selected the president and vice president.

Background and vote
Ever since the Civil War, Kentucky had been shaped politically by divisions created by that war between secessionist, Democratic counties and Unionist, Republican ones, although the state as a whole leaned Democratic throughout this era and the GOP would never carry the state during the Third Party System. However, the Democratic Party in the state was heavily divided over free silver and the role of corporations in the middle 1890s, and it lost the governorship for the first time in forty years in 1895 due to Populist defections. In 1896, the state’s growing urban and coal mining areas, which unlike most parts of the South had developed economic ties with the Midwest and Northeast and thus opposed free silver, gave William McKinley sufficient support to carry Kentucky by a very narrow margin of 277 votes in what remains the seventh-closest vote for presidential electors on record.

For the rematch in 1900, an early poll had the state in doubt. By the final week of October, polls generally had returning Democratic nominee William Jennings Bryan carrying the state, and this he did by a 1.71 percent margin. His win was generally attributed to the fact that urban and coal counties were more tolerant of anti-imperialism (directed against American colonialism in the Pacific islands) than free silver.

Results

Results by county

Notes

References

Kentucky
1900
1900 Kentucky elections